Erika Jones (born June 19, 1988 as Erika Rae Anschutz) is an American archer. She has won gold medals at both major World Archery Federation compound discipline competitions, the World Archery Championships and Archery World Cup, as well as numerous other national, regional and international competitions, including a World Championships cadet title at age 13. She turned professional in 2006 and is a former world number one archer. Jones graduated from the University of Nebraska – Lincoln in 2010. Erika Jones holds the current indoor world record of the World Archery 18m round for Compound Women, at 595 points, shot in Nîmes, France on February 26, 2014.

References

External links

 

American female archers
Living people
1988 births
World Archery Championships medalists
World Games gold medalists
Universiade medalists in archery
Competitors at the 2013 World Games
Universiade silver medalists for the United States
Universiade bronze medalists for the United States
World Games medalists in archery
21st-century American women
University of Nebraska–Lincoln alumni